Ilia Kandelaki (born 26 December 1981) is a retired Georgian footballer of Caucasus Greek descent who currently plays for Sioni Bolnisi.

Kandelaki played five times at UEFA Euro 2008 qualifying but not in the 2010 FIFA World Cup qualification (UEFA).

References

External links
 
 Ilia Kandelaki at Guardian Football
 

1981 births
Living people
Footballers from Georgia (country)
Georgia (country) international footballers
Expatriate footballers from Georgia (country)
FC Dinamo Tbilisi players
FC Chornomorets Odesa players
FC Carl Zeiss Jena players
SK Sturm Graz players
Shamakhi FK players
FC Zestafoni players
FC Sioni Bolnisi players
Ukrainian Premier League players
Austrian Football Bundesliga players
2. Bundesliga players
Expatriate footballers in Germany
Expatriate footballers in Ukraine
Expatriate sportspeople from Georgia (country) in Ukraine
Expatriate footballers in Austria
Expatriate footballers in Azerbaijan
Association football defenders
Expatriate sportspeople from Georgia (country) in Azerbaijan